Augustin Pfleger (1635 – after 23 July 1686) was a German Bohemian composer.

Life
Pfleger was born at Schlackenwerth (now Ostrov) and became a court musician at Schlackenwerth. In 1662 he moved to the court of the Duke of Mecklenburg in Güstrow and in 1665 to Gottorf as Kapellmeister at the Schleswig-Holstein court. In 1686 he was again at Schlackenwerth, where he died.

Works
Psalmi, dialogi et motettae, op.1 (Hamburg, 1661)
Odae concertantes (Kiel, 1666)

German Motets
Ach, dass ich Wassers genug hätte, 5vv, 2 va, ed. in Cw, lii (1938); 
Ach, die Menschen sind umgeben mit viel Krankheit, 5vv, 3 va; 
Ach Herr, du Sohn Davids, 4vv, 2 va, S ii; 
Ach, wenn Christus sich liess finden, 5vv, 3 va, S i; 
Christen haben gleiche Freud, 5vv, 2 vn, S i; 
Der Herr ist ein Heiland, 4vv, 3 va da braccio; 
Der Herr ist gross von Wundertat, 5vv, 2 vn, S ii
Der Mensch ist nicht geschaffen zum Müssiggang, 4vv, 2 vn, 2 va da braccio; 
Die Ernte ist gross, 5vv, 2 vn, va da gamba, S ii; 
Erbarm dich mein, O Herre Gott, 5vv, 2 vn, 2 va da braccio; 
Es wird das Szepter von Juda nicht entwendet werden, 5vv, 2 vn, 2 va, S i; 
Friede sei mit euch, 4vv, vn, 2 va da gamba; 
Fürchtet den Herrn, 5vv, 2 vn; 
Gestern ist mir zugesaget, 4vv, 2 vn, S i; 
Gott bauet selbst sein Himmelreich, 3vv, 2 vn, S ii 
Gottes Geist bemüht sich sehr, 4vv, 2 vn, 2 va da braccio; 
Gott ist einem König gleich, 4vv, 2 va; 
Herr, haben wir nicht, 4vv, 3 va; 
Herr, wann willst du mich bekehren, 3vv, 3 va; 
Herr, wer wird wohnen in deiner Hütten, 4vv, 3 va; 
Herr, wir können uns nicht nähren, 5vv, 2 va; 
Heute kann man recht verstehen, 4vv, 2 vn, 2 va da braccio; 
Heut freue dich, Christenheit der Heiland, 4vv, 2 vn, 2 va da braccio, S i
Heut freue dich, Christenheit vom Himmel, 4vv, 2 vn, 2 va da braccio, S i; 
Heut ist Gottes Himmelreich, 5vv, 2 vn, 2 va; 
Hilf, Herr Jesu, lass gelingen, 4vv, 3 va, S i; 
Ich bin das Licht der Welt, 5vv, 3 va; 
Ich bin ein guter Hirte, 3vv, 2 vn, 2 va da gamba or da braccio; 
Ich bin wie ein verirret’ und verloren Schaf, 4vv, 2 vn; 
Ich danke dir, Gott, 5vv, 3 va
Ich gehe hin zu dem, 5vv, 2 vn, 2 va da gamba; 
Ich sage euch, 4vv, 2 vn, 2 va da braccio; 
Ich suchte des Nachts in meinem Bette, 4vv, 2 vn, 2 va; 
Ich will meinen Mund auftun, 4vv, 2 vn, S ii; 
Im Anfang war das Wort, 4vv, 3 va, S i; 
Jesu, lieber Meister, 4vv, 3 va; 
Jesus trieb ein’ Teufel aus, 5vv, 2 va, S ii; 
Jetzt gehet an die neue Zeit, 5vv, 2 va
Kommt, denn es ist alles bereit, 4vv, 3 va da braccio; 
Kommt her, ihr Christenleut, 5vv, 2 va, S i; 
Lernet von mir, 4vv, 3 va; 
Mache dich auf, 4vv, 2 vn, S i; 
Meine Tränen sind meine Speise, 4vv, 2 vn, 2 va da braccio; 
Mein Sohn, woll’t Gott, 3vv, 3 va; 
Meister, was soll ich tun, 5vv, 3 va; 
Meister, welches ist das fürnehmste; 
Gebot, 5vv, 3 va; 
Meister, wir wissen, 5vv, 3 va
Mensch, lebe fromm, 3vv, 2 vn; 
Merket, wie der Herr uns liebet, 4vv, 3 va; 
Mich jammert des Volkes, 5vv, 2 vn; 
Nun gehe ich hin, 5vv, 2 vn; 
O barmherziger Vater, lv, 4 va; 
O Freude, und dennoch Leid, 4vv, 2 vn, 2 va da braccio; 
O, Tod, wie bitter bist du, 4vv, 2 va da braccio; 
Preiset ihr Christen mit Hertzen und Munde, 5vv, 2 vn, 2 va da braccio; 
Saget der Tochter Sion, 4vv, 2 vn, 2 va; 
Schauet an den Liebes Geist, 4vv, 2 vn
Sieben letzte Worte Jesu Christi am Kreuz;
Siehe dein Vater, 5vv, 3 va, S ii; 
Sollt nicht das liebe Jesulein, 4vv, 2 va, S i; 
So spricht der Herr, 4vv, 3 va, S ii; 
Triumph! Jubilieret, 6vv, 2 vn, 2 va; 
Und er trat in das Schiff, 5vv, 3 va, S ii; 
Und es war eine Hochzeit zu Cana, 5vv, 2 vn, 2 va, S ii; 
Und Jesus ward verkläret vor seinen Jüngern, 6vv, 2 vn, 2 va, S ii; 
Wahrlich, ich sage dir, 4vv, 2 vn, 2 va da braccio; 
Wahrlich, ich sage euch, 4vv, 3 va
Weg mit aller Lust und Lachen, 3vv, 2 va, S ii; 
Wenn aber der Tröster kommen wird, 5vv, 2 vn, 2 va da braccio; 
Wenn die Christen sind vermessen, 4vv, 3 va; 
Wenn du es wüsstest, 4vv, 3 va; 
Wer ist wie der Herr unser Gott, 4vv, 3 va; 
Wir müssen alle offenbar werden, 5vv, 3 va; 
Zwar bin ich des Herren Statt, 4vv, 3 va

Latin Motets
Ad te clamat cor meum, 1v, 4 insts; 
Confitebor tibi, 4vv, 2 vn, va; 
Cum complerentur dies, 5vv, 2 va, 2 va da gamba; 
Diligam te Domine, 5vv; 
Dominus virtutum nobiscum, 5vv, 2 vn, va, va da gamba; 
Eheu mortalis, 4vv, 3 va; 
Fratres, ego enim accepi a Domino, 3vv, 3 va; 
Inclina Domine, 4vv, 4 va; 
In tribulatione, 4vv, 3 va da gamba; 
Justorum animae in manu Dei sunt, 1v, 4 va; 
Laetabundus et jucundus, 4vv, 2 vn; 
Laetatus sum in his, 4vv, 2 vn, 2 va
Lauda Jerusalem, 4vv, 2 vn, 2 va; 
Laudate Dominum, omnes gentes, 4vv, 4 insts (2 versions); 
Laudate pueri, 3vv, 3 va da gamba; 
Missus est angelus, 3vv, 2 va; 
Nisi Dominus aedificavit, 2vv, 2 vn; 
O altitudo divitiarum, 5vv, 4 va; 
O divini amor, 1v, 4 va; 
O jucunda dies, 2vv, 2 vn, 2 va da gamba; 
Si quis est cupiens, 1v, 2 vn, 2 va da gamba; 
Veni Sancte Spiritus, 8vv, 10 insts; 
Veni Sancte Spiritus, 4vv, 2 vn, 2 va

Lost works
89 Latin sacred concertos
9 German cantatas
4 Latin cantatas.

Sources
Kerala J. Snyder's article in New Grove Dictionary of Music

References

External links
 

1635 births
1686 deaths
17th-century classical composers
German Baroque composers
German male classical composers
German Bohemian people
People from the Kingdom of Bohemia
People from Ostrov (Karlovy Vary District)
17th-century male musicians